Fazlollah Reza (January 1, 1915 – November 19, 2019) was an Iranian university professor.

Career
Reza graduated from the Faculty of Engineering of the University of Tehran in 1938, receiving a bachelor's degree in electrical engineering. He received a master's and Ph.D. in electrical engineering from Columbia University in 1946 and Polytechnic University of New York (now New York University Tandon School of Engineering) in 1950 respectively. He was a Fellow of the IEEE and AAAS for his contribution to network and information theory. He was an honorary member of the Academy of Persian Language and Literature and wrote and spoke extensively on classical Persian poetry.

Positions
Reza served as the head of Aryamehr University of Industry (Sharif University of Technology), University of Tehran, Iran's ambassador to Canada and Iran's ambassador to UNESCO. As a professor, he taught at MIT, McGill University, Concordia University, and the University of Tehran.

Bibliography

See also
Enayatollah Reza (brother)
Esmail Merat

External links
 Short biography

1915 births
2019 deaths
Iranian electrical engineers
Iranian engineers
University of Tehran alumni
Columbia School of Engineering and Applied Science alumni
Academic staff of Sharif University of Technology
Massachusetts Institute of Technology faculty
People from Rasht
Ambassadors of Iran to Canada
Permanent Delegates of Iran to UNESCO
People from Gilan Province
Chancellors of the Sharif University of Technology
Fellow Members of the IEEE
Iranian centenarians
Men centenarians
Polytechnic Institute of New York University alumni
Chancellors of the University of Tehran